Keiner is a German surname. Notable people with the surname include:

Marco Keiner (born 1963), German United Nations official
Michael Keiner (born 1959), German poker player
Steve Keiner, American competitive eater
Walter Keiner (1890–1978), German general

German-language surnames